Dongfeng Sokon Automobile known internationally as DFSK Motor, is a joint venture between Dongfeng and Chongqing Sokon Industry Group Co Ltd., formed on June 27th, 2003.

DFSK produces microvans, flat-bed commercial trucks and passenger vehicles under the Xiaokang brand and sport utility vehicle under the Fengguang (Fengon in English) and Glory brands. Manufacturing for DFSK takes place in a total of four different facilities, two of which are located in Hubei Shiyan and two in Chongqing.

History 
At the beginning of 2000, Chongqing Yu'an Innovation Technology (Group), a manufacturer of motorcycles and automotive components, and Dongfeng Motor evaluated the possibility of manufacturing microvans intended for small Chinese businesses. Dongfeng had experience producing cars for PSA, but had not yet produced vehicles in the light commercial segment, and approved the project.

In 2003 the joint venture Dongfeng Yu'an Automobile, headquartered in Chongqing, was formed and work began on the construction of a new factory. Yu'an Group provided the design for the microvans, and acquired licensing for the production of chassis, engines, and components for microvans from Suzuki. Dongfeng was responsible for the engineering and testing of the vehicles. In 2005, they debuted their first small van, called the C-Series. It was offered in multiple configurations (paneled, passenger minibus and pick-up) with Suzuki engines and rear-wheel drive. At its debut, the Yu'an Group changed its name to Chongquin Sokon Industry Group (abbreviated to Sokon in English or Xiaokang in Chinese) and the joint venture consequently became Dongfeng Sokon Automobile (abbreviated to DFSK).

In the Chinese market the vehicles are sold as Dongfeng Sokon while in the export markets the name DFSK is used. In both cases, the brand on the grille is Dongfeng's “Dual Wings”.

Subsequently DFSK presents numerous other models of minivans and starts exporting them also in Europe; in the UK they will be distributed by subsidiary Sokon Automobile while in Italy by Giotti Victoria.

In September 2003, Chongqing Ruichi Automobiles (瑞驰新能源公司), a fully-funded subsidiary of Chongqing Sokon Group was established. As an enterprise for the manufacturing, sales and services for the pure electric commercial vehicles, Ruichi is one of the earliest enterprises in China with qualifications for the production of pure electric commercial vehicles. Chongqing Ruichi Automobiles is now a fully-funded subsidiary of Seres, with products being rebadged electrified versions of DFSK's microvans and trucks. 

In 2013, DFSK decided to enter the lucrative  SUV market by starting the design of a seven-seater mid-size vehicle using Dongfeng technologies; this vehicle was designed so that it could have an aggressive price classifying itself as a low-cost family car and had to be sold both in China and abroad. The project debuted in 2016 called Dongfeng Fengguang 580, a five and seven-seater front-wheel or four-wheel drive SUV with Mitsubishi engines. The brand name Fengguang (translated into Fengon in English) is used to distinguish them from the production of minivans called Sokon. On foreign markets, this vehicle will be renamed DFSK Glory (easier to pronounce) using the Dongfeng Dual Wings emblem on the grille, interior and rear.

In the same years, the production of the minivan range was started in Indonesia and Thailand and exports also to South America and Eastern Europe.

DFSK began to assemble and market products in Indonesia in 2015. Plans at the time of launch included an expected production of 50,000 units/year.

In 2017, joint venture of DFSK and Regal Automobile began assembly in Pakistan. Plant in Lahore producing SUV Glory 580 variants, C-37 Van, Humsafar MPV, K01 Pickup truck etc.

Total sales in 2017 reached 402,000 vehicles and in November 2018 Chongqing Sokon Group attempted to acquire the remaining 50% of the DFSK joint venture from Dongfeng for 621 million euros, becoming 100% owner. The deal was abandoned in July 2019

In September 2019, Sokon acquired the remaining 50% of the DFSK joint venture from Dongfeng Motor Group (DFG), becoming 100% owner. They continue to produce vehicles using the Dongfeng logo and under the Dongfeng Sokon and Dongfeng Fengguang (Fengon) branding.

List of vehicles

Dongfeng Xiaokang (东风小康)/ DFSK (Sokon)
The DFSK (Sokon) or Dongfeng Xiaokang brand is the sub-brand of Dongfeng Xiaokang that produces light commercial vehicles.
Currently available products include:
C-Series
 Sokon C37/C36
 Sokon C31/C32
K-Series
 Sokon K05
 Sokon K07
 Sokon K09
 Sokon K05S
 Sokon K07S
 Sokon K01/K02
 V-Series
 Sokon V07S- microvan
 Sokon V21- single cab pickup
 Sokon V22- crew cab pickup
 Sokon V25- microvan
 Sokon V26- microvan
 Sokon V27- microvan
 Sokon V29- microvan/ pickup
 Ruichi (瑞驰) EV
 EC35- mid-size van
 EC31- small box truck
 ED75- mid-size van based on a reverse-engineered copy of the Toyota HiAce body

Dongfeng Fengguang/Fengon
Dongfeng Fengguang/Fengon (or DFSK Glory for foreign markets) is the sub-brand of Dongfeng Xiaokang that produces passenger vehicles. Established in 2008, Dongfeng Fengguang has a series of affordable compact MPVs and CUVs.
Currently available products include:
 Fengon E3 subcompact CUV
 Fengon ix5 mid-size CUV
 Fengon ix7 mid-size SUV
 Dongfeng Fengguang 580 mid-size CUV
 Dongfeng Fengguang S560 compact CUV
 Dongfeng Fengguang 370 compact MPV
 Dongfeng Fengguang 330S compact MPV
 Dongfeng Fengguang 330 compact MPV

Volt EV
Volt EV is a new marque producing mini EVs for export in Thailand.

See also

References

External links
 

 
Electric vehicle manufacturers of China
Bus manufacturers of China
Truck manufacturers of China
Chinese brands
Car brands